The Spaç Prison was a political prison in Communist Albania at the village of Spaç. The former prison is listed as a second-category national monument. There were plans to turn the rapidly deteriorating site into a museum, but as of February 2013, no progress had been made at the location. In 1973, a number of prisoners staged a rebellion where the non-communist flag was raised. In 1984, a similar rebellion took place at the prison of Qafë Bar.

In 2015, the prison was listed by the New York-based organisation World Monument Fund as one of the 50 most endangered monuments worldwide.

In 2019, Tirana-based organization Cultural Heritage without Border - Albania, with the help of a team of students from Worcester Polytechnic Institute created a publicly accessible digital reconstruction of the Spaç Prison.

See also 
 Forced labour camps in Communist Albania
 Prison of Burrel

References

External links 
 Spaç prison on Youtube
 See the location of former political prison of Spaç on Google Map

People's Socialist Republic of Albania
Prisons in Albania
Buildings and structures in Mirditë